Senator Borden may refer to:

Nathaniel B. Borden (1801–1865), Massachusetts State Senate
Win Borden (1943–2014), Minnesota State Senate